Pyotr Klavdievich  Kirillov (17 May 1895 – 14 January 1942) was a Soviet actor, film director, screenwriter.

He died on January 14, 1942, during the Siege of Leningrad.

Selected filmography 
 1928 —  Mutiny   as partisan Eryskin
 1934 — Crown Prince of the Republic as Nikolai
 1936 — The Sailors of Kronstadt as Valentin
 1938 — The Great Citizen as Bryantsev
 1941 — Tanker "Derbent" as Bredis

References

External links 
 Пётр Кириллов on kino-teatr.ru

Soviet male film actors
1895 births
1942 deaths
Victims of the Siege of Leningrad
Soviet film directors
Male actors from Saint Petersburg